The Brisbois Formation is a geologic formation in Oregon. It preserves fossils dating back to the Triassic period.

See also

 List of fossiliferous stratigraphic units in Oregon
 Paleontology in Oregon

References
 

Triassic geology of Oregon